Korea University Museum (고려대학교박물관), commonly called The University Museum, is a history, archaeology, and art museum that is part of the Korea University in Seoul, South Korea

History

Museum building
The Museum is housed in the Centennial Memorial Samsung Hall that is one of the landmarks of the Korea University campus.

Collections

External links
 Korea University Museum website

Korea University
Museums in Seoul
University museums in South Korea
Museums established in 1934
Archaeological museums in South Korea
History museums in South Korea
Art museums and galleries in South Korea
1934 establishments in Korea